Asiab Sar (also Romanized as Āsīāb Sar) is a village in Chehel Shahid Rural District, in the Central District of Ramsar County, Mazandaran Province, Iran. At the 2006 census, its population was 500, in 145 families.

References 

Populated places in Ramsar County